Bloomington High School may refer to:

Bloomington High School (Bloomington, California), Bloomington, California
Bloomington High School (Bloomington, Illinois), Bloomington, Illinois
Old Bloomington High School, the previous high school building in Bloomington, Illinois
Bloomington High School North, Bloomington, Indiana
Bloomington High School South, Bloomington, Indiana
Bloomington High School (Bloomington, Texas), Bloomington, Texas
Idt-Bloomington, Bloomington, Minnesota